These are the official results of the Men's Javelin Throw event at the 1995 World Championships in Gothenburg, Sweden. There were a total number of 37 participating athletes, with the final held on Sunday 13 August 1995. The qualification mark was set at 82.00 metres.

Medalists

Schedule
All times are Central European Time (UTC+1)

Abbreviations
All results shown are in metres

Records

Qualification

Group A

Group B

Final

See also
 1991 Men's World Championships Javelin Throw (Tokyo)
 1992 Men's Olympic Javelin Throw (Barcelona)
 1994 Men's European Championships Javelin Throw (Helsinki)
 1996 Men's Olympic Javelin Throw (Atlanta)
 1998 Men's European Championships Javelin Throw (Budapest)

References
 Results
 koti.welho

J
Javelin throw at the World Athletics Championships